Brandenburgian, Brandenburgish or Brandenburgisch is a dialect spoken in Germany in the northern and western parts of Brandenburg (Uckermark, Prignitz and Mittelmark regions) as well as in northern Saxony-Anhalt (Altmark). The language area can be further divided between into North-Markish (Stendal, Wittenberge, Prenzlau) and Middle-Markish (Brandenburg an der Havel).

Brandenburgish was the East Low German dialect of the Brandenburg margraviate, but it has been much influenced by the East Central German dialects and by Standard High German. With the development of the Berlin metropolitan area the original Low German Brandenburgisch together with Berlinerisch has formed the local High German dialects, which today are considered an East Central German subgroup. The spread of High German into the Brandenburgish language area is an ongoing process.

References

Low German
German dialects
Brandenburg